The Ecuador Fed Cup team represents Ecuador in Fed Cup tennis competition and are governed by the Federación Ecuatoriana de Tenis.  They currently compete in the Americas Zone of Group II.

History
Ecuador competed in its first Fed Cup in 1972.  Their best result was reaching the round of 16 in their debut year.

See also
Fed Cup
Ecuador Davis Cup team

External links

Billie Jean King Cup teams
Fed Cup
Fed Cup